Hindu temple architecture as the main form of Hindu architecture has many varieties of style, though the basic nature of the Hindu temple remains the same, with the essential feature an inner sanctum, the garbha griha or womb-chamber, where the primary Murti or the image of a deity is housed in a simple bare cell. This chamber often has an open area designed for movement in clockwise rotation for rituals and prayers. Around this chamber there are often other structures and buildings, in the largest cases covering several acres. On the exterior, the garbhagriha is crowned by a tower-like shikhara, also called the vimana in the south.  The shrine building often includes an circumambulatory passage for parikrama, a mandapa congregation hall, and sometimes an antarala antechamber and porch between garbhagriha and mandapa. There may be other mandapas or other buildings, connected or detached, in large temples, together with other small temples in the compound.

Hindu temple architecture reflects a synthesis of arts, the ideals of dharma, values and the way of life cherished under Hinduism. The temple is a place for Tirtha—pilgrimage. All the cosmic elements that create and celebrate life in Hindu pantheon, are present in a Hindu temple—from fire to water, from images of nature to deities, from the feminine to the masculine, from kama to artha, from the fleeting sounds and incense smells to Purusha—the eternal nothingness yet universality—is part of a Hindu temple architecture. The form and meanings of architectural elements in a Hindu temple are designed to function as the place where it is the link between man and the divine, to help his progress to spiritual knowledge and truth, his liberation it calls moksha.

The architectural principles of Hindu temples in India are described in Shilpa Shastras and Vastu Sastras. The Hindu culture has encouraged aesthetic independence to its temple builders, and its architects have sometimes exercised considerable flexibility in creative expression by adopting other perfect geometries and mathematical principles in Mandir construction to express the Hindu way of life.

History

Early structures

Remains of early elliptical shrines discovered in Besnagar (3rd-2nd century BCE) and Nagari (1st century BCE), may be the earliest known Hindu temple structures, associated to the early Bhagavata tradition, a precursor of Vaishnavism. In Tamil Nadu, the earliest version of the Murugan Temple, Saluvankuppam, north-facing and in brick, appears to date from between the 3rd century BCE and 3rd century CE.  

In Besnagar, the temple structures have been found in conjonction with the Heliodorus pillar dedicated to Vāsudeva. The archaeologists found an ancient elliptical foundation, extensive floor and plinth produced from burnt bricks. Further, the foundations for all the major components of a Hindu temple – garbhagriha (sanctum), pradakshinapatha (circumambulation passage), antarala (antechamber next to sanctum) and mandapa (gathering hall) – were found. These sections had a thick support base for their walls. These core temple remains cover an area of 30 x 30 m. The sections had post-holes, which likely contained the wooden pillars for the temple superstructure above. In the soil were iron nails that likely held together the wooden pillars. The superstructure of the temple was likely made of wood, mud and other perishable materials.

The ancient temple complex discovered in Nagari (Chittorgarh, Rajasthan) – about 500 kilometers to the west of Vidisha, has a sub-surface structure nearly identical to that of the Besnagar temple. The structure is also associated to the cult of Vāsudeva and Saṃkarṣaṇa, and dated to the 1st century BCE.

Classical period (4-6th century)

Though there are hardly any remains of stone Hindu temples before the Gupta dynasty in the 5th century CE, there  probably were earlier structures in timber-based architecture. The rock-cut Udayagiri Caves (401 CE) are among the most important early sites, built with royal sponsorship, recorded by inscriptions, and with impressive sculpture. The earliest preserved Hindu temples are simple cell-like stone temples, some rock-cut and others structural, as at Temple 17 at Sanchi. By the 6th or 7th century, these evolved into high shikhara stone superstructures. However, there is inscriptional evidence such as the ancient Gangadhara inscription from about 424, states Meister, that towering temples existed before this time and these were possibly made from more perishable material. These temples have not survived.

Examples of early major North Indian temples that have survived after the Udayagiri Caves in Madhya Pradesh include those at Tigawa, Deogarh, Parvati Temple, Nachna (465), Bhitargaon, the largest Gupta brick temple to survive,  Lakshman Brick Temple, Sirpur (600-625 CE); Rajiv Lochan temple, Rajim (7th-century).  Gop Temple in Gujarat (c. 550 or later) is an oddity, with no surviving close comparator.

No pre-7th century CE South Indian free-standing stone temples have survived. Examples of early major South Indian temples that have survived, some in ruins, include the diverse styles at Mahabalipuram, from the 7th and 8th centuries. According to Meister, the Mahabalipuram temples are "monolithic models of a variety of formal structures all of which already can be said to typify a developed "Dravida" (South Indian) order". They suggest a tradition and a knowledge base existed in South India by the time of the early Chalukya and Pallava era when these were built.  In the Deccan, Cave 3 of the Badami cave temples was cut out in 578 CE, and Cave 1 is probably slightly earlier. Other examples are found in Aihole and Pattadakal.

Medieval Period (7th to 16th century)

By about the 7th century most main features of the Hindu temple were established along with theoretical texts on temple architecture and building methods. From between about the 7th and 13th centuries a large number of temples and their ruins have survived (though far fewer than once existed).  Many regional styles developed, very often following political divisions, as large temples were typically built with royal patronage.  The Vesara style originated in the region between the Krishna and Tungabhadra rivers that is contemporary north Karnataka. According to some art historians, the roots of Vesara style can be traced to the Chalukyas of Badami (500-753AD) whose Early Chalukya or Badami Chalukya architecture built temples in a style that mixed some features of the nagara and the dravida styles, for example using both the northern shikhara and southern vimana type of superstructure over the sanctum in different temples of similar date, as at Pattadakal. This style was further refined by the Rashtrakutas of Manyakheta (750-983AD) in sites such as Ellora. Though there is clearly a good deal of continuity with the Badami or Early Chalukya style, other writers only date the start of Vesara to the later Western Chalukyas of Kalyani (983-1195 AD), in sites such as Lakkundi, Dambal, Itagi, and Gadag, and continued by the Hoysala empire (1000-1330 AD).

The earliest examples of Pallava architecture are rock-cut temples dating from 610 to 690 CE and structural temples between 690 and 900 CE. The greatest accomplishments of the Pallava architecture are the rock-cut Group of Monuments at Mahabalipuram at Mahabalipuram, a UNESCO World Heritage Site, including the Shore Temple. This group includes both excavated pillared halls, with no external roof except the natural rock, and monolithic shrines where the natural rock is entirely cut away and carved to give an external roof. Early temples were mostly dedicated to Shiva. The Kailasanatha temple also called Rajasimha Pallaveswaram in Kanchipuram built by Narasimhavarman II also known as Rajasimha is a fine example of the Pallava style temple.

Western Chalukya architecture linked between the Badami Chalukya Architecture of the 8th century and the Hoysala architecture popularised in the 13th century. The art of Western Chalukyas is sometimes called the "Gadag style" after the number of ornate temples they built in the Tungabhadra – Krishna River doab region of present-day Gadag district in Karnataka. Their temple building reached its maturity and culmination in the 12th century, with over a hundred temples built across the deccan, more than half of them in present-day Karnataka. Apart from temples they are also well known for ornate stepped wells (Pushkarni) which served as ritual bathing places, many of which are well preserved in Lakkundi. Their stepped well designs were later incorporated by the Hoysalas and the Vijayanagara empire in the coming centuries.

In the north, Muslim invasions from the 11th century onwards reduced the building of temples, and saw the loss of many existing ones.  The south also witnessed Hindu-Muslim conflict that affected the temples, but the region was relatively less affected than the north. In late 14th century, the Hindu Vijayanagara Empire came to power and controlled much of South India. During this period, the distinctive very tall gopuram gatehouse, (actually a late development, from the 12th century or later), was typically added to older large temples.

South-East Asian Hindu temples

Possibly the oldest Hindu temples in South East Asia dates back to 2nd century BCE from the Funan site of Oc Eo in the Mekong Delta. They were probably dedicated to a sun god, Shiva and Vishnu.  The temple were constructed using granite blocks and bricks, one with a small stepped pond.

The earliest evidence trace to Sanskrit stone inscriptions found on the islands and the mainland Southeast Asia is the Võ Cạnh inscription of Champa dated to 2nd or 3rd century CE in Vietnam or in Cambodia between  4th and 5th-century CE. Prior to the 14th-century local versions of Hindu temples were built in Myanmar, Malaysia, Indonesia, Thailand, Cambodia, Laos and Vietnam. These developed several national traditions, and often mixed Hinduism and Buddhism. Theravada Buddhism prevailed in many parts of the South-East Asia, except Malaysia and Indonesia where Islam displaced them both.

Hindu temples in South-East Asia developed their own distinct versions, mostly based on Indian architectural models, both North Indian and South Indian styles. However, the Southeast Asian temple architecture styles are different and there is no known single temple in India that can be the source of the Southeast Asian temples. According to Michell, it is as if the Southeast Asian architects learned from "the theoretical prescriptions about temple building" from Indian texts, but never saw one. They reassembled the elements with their own creative interpretations. The Hindu temples found in Southeast Asia are more conservative and far more strongly link the Mount Meru-related cosmological elements of Indian thought than the Hindu temples found in the subcontinent. Additionally, unlike the Indian temples, the sacred architecture in Southeast Asia associated the ruler (devaraja) with the divine, with the temple serving as a memorial to the king as much as being house of gods. Notable examples of Southeast Asian Hindu temple architecture are the Shivaist Prambanan Trimurti temple compound in Java, Indonesia (9th century), and the Vishnuite Angkor Wat in Cambodia (12th century).

Design

A Hindu temple is a symmetry-driven structure, with many variations, on a square grid of padas, depicting perfect geometric shapes such as circles and squares. Susan Lewandowski states that the underlying principle in a Hindu temple is built around the belief that all things are one, everything is connected. A temple, states Lewandowski, "replicates again and again the Hindu beliefs in the parts mirroring, and at the same time being, the universal whole" like an "organism of repeating cells". The pilgrim is welcomed through mathematically structured spaces, a network of art, pillars with carvings and statues that display and celebrate the four important and necessary principles of human life—the pursuit of artha (prosperity, wealth), the pursuit of kama (desire), the pursuit of dharma (virtues, ethical life) and the pursuit of moksha (release, self-knowledge).

At the centre of the temple, typically below and sometimes above or next to the deity, is mere hollow space with no decoration, symbolically representing Purusa, the Supreme Principle, the sacred Universal, one without form, which is present everywhere, connects everything, and is the essence of everyone. A Hindu temple is meant to encourage reflection, facilitate purification of one's mind, and trigger the process of inner realization within the devotee. The specific process is left to the devotee's school of belief. The primary deity of different Hindu temples varies to reflect this spiritual spectrum.

The site
The appropriate site for a Mandir, suggest ancient Sanskrit texts, is near water and gardens, where lotus and flowers bloom, where swans, ducks and other birds are heard, where animals rest without fear of injury or harm. These harmonious places were recommended in these texts with the explanation that such are the places where gods play, and thus the best site for Hindu temples.

While major Hindu mandirs are recommended at sangams (confluence of rivers), river banks, lakes and seashore, the Brhat Samhita and Puranas suggest temples may also be built where a natural source of water is not present. Here too, they recommend that a pond be built preferably in front or to the left of the temple with water gardens. If water is neither present naturally nor by design, water is symbolically present at the consecration of temple or the deity. Temples may also be built, suggests Visnudharmottara in Part III of Chapter 93, inside caves and carved stones, on hill tops affording peaceful views, mountain slopes overlooking beautiful valleys, inside forests and hermitages, next to gardens, or at the head of a town street.

In practice most temples are built as part of a village or town. Some sites such as the capitals of kingdoms and those considered particularly favourable in terms of sacred geography had numerous temples.  Many ancient capitals vanished and the surviving temples are now found in a rural landscape; often these are the best-preserved examples of older styles. Aihole, Badami, Pattadakal and Gangaikonda Cholapuram are examples.

The plan

The design, especially the floor plan, of the part of a Hindu temple around the sanctum or shrine follows a geometrical design called vastu-purusha-mandala. The name is a composite Sanskrit word with three of the most important components of the plan. Mandala means circle, Purusha is universal essence at the core of Hindu tradition, while Vastu means the dwelling structure. Vastupurushamandala is a yantra. The design lays out a Hindu temple in a symmetrical, self-repeating structure derived from central beliefs, myths, cardinality and mathematical principles.

The four cardinal directions help create the axis of a Hindu temple, around which is formed a perfect square in the space available. The circle of mandala circumscribes the square. The square is considered divine for its perfection and as a symbolic product of knowledge and human thought, while circle is considered earthly, human and observed in everyday life (moon, sun, horizon, water drop, rainbow). Each supports the other. The square is divided into perfect square grids. In large temples, this is often a 8×8 or 64-grid structure. In ceremonial temple superstructures, this is an 81 sub-square grid. The squares are called ‘‘padas’’. The square is symbolic and has Vedic origins from fire altar, Agni. The alignment along cardinal direction, similarly is an extension of Vedic rituals of three fires. This symbolism is also found among Greek and other ancient civilizations, through the gnomon. In Hindu temple manuals, design plans are described with 1, 4, 9, 16, 25, 36, 49, 64, 81 up to 1024 squares; 1 pada is considered the simplest plan, as a seat for a hermit or devotee to sit and meditate on, do yoga, or make offerings with Vedic fire in front. The second design of 4 padas has a symbolic central core at the diagonal intersection, and is also a meditative layout. The 9 pada design has a sacred surrounded centre, and is the template for the smallest temple. Older Hindu temple vastumandalas may use the 9 through 49 pada series, but 64 is considered the most sacred geometric grid in Hindu temples. It is also called Manduka, Bhekapada or Ajira in various ancient Sanskrit texts. Each pada is conceptually assigned to a symbolic element, sometimes in the form of a deity or to a spirit or apasara. The central square(s) of the 64 is dedicated to the Brahman (not to be confused with Brahmin), and are called Brahma padas.

In a Hindu temple's structure of symmetry and concentric squares, each concentric layer has significance. The outermost layer, Paisachika padas, signify aspects of Asuras and evil; the next inner concentric layer is Manusha padas signifying human life; while Devika padas  signify aspects of Devas and good. The Manusha padas typically houses the ambulatory. The devotees, as they walk around in clockwise fashion through this ambulatory to complete Parikrama (or Pradakshina), walk between good on inner side and evil on the outer side. In smaller temples, the Paisachika pada is not part of the temple superstructure, but may be on the boundary of the temple or just symbolically represented.

The Paisachika padas, Manusha padas and Devika padas surround Brahma padas, which signifies creative energy and serves as the location for temple's primary idol for darsana. Finally at the very centre of Brahma padas is Garbhagruha(Garbha- Centre, gruha- house; literally the centre of the house) (Purusa Space), signifying Universal Principle present in everything and everyone. The spire of a Hindu temple, called Shikhara in north India and Vimana in south India, is perfectly aligned above the Brahma pada(s).

Beneath the mandala's central square(s) is the space for the formless shapeless all pervasive all connecting Universal Spirit, the Purusha. This space is sometimes referred to as garbha-griya (literally womb house) – a small, perfect square, windowless, enclosed space without ornamentation that represents universal essence. In or near this space is typically a murti. This is the main deity image, and this varies with each temple. Often it is this idol that gives it a local name, such as Vishnu temple, Krishna temple, Rama temple, Narayana temple, Siva temple, Lakshmi temple, Ganesha temple, Durga temple, Hanuman temple, Surya temple, and others. It is this garbha-griya which devotees seek for ‘‘darsana’’ (literally, a sight of knowledge, or vision).

Above the vastu-purusha-mandala is a high superstructure called the shikhara in north India, and vimana in south India, that stretches towards the sky. Sometimes, in makeshift temples, the superstructure may be replaced with symbolic bamboo with few leaves at the top. The vertical dimension's cupola or dome is designed as a pyramid, conical or other mountain-like shape, once again using principle of concentric circles and squares (see below). Scholars such as Lewandowski state that this shape is inspired by cosmic mountain of Mount Meru or Himalayan Kailasa, the abode of gods according to its ancient mythology.
 
In larger temples, the outer three padas are visually decorated with carvings, paintings or images meant to inspire the devotee. In some temples, these images or wall reliefs may be stories from Hindu Epics, in others they may be Vedic tales about right and wrong or virtues and vice, in some they may be idols of minor or regional deities. The pillars, walls and ceilings typically also have highly ornate carvings or images of the four just and necessary pursuits of life—kama, artha, dharma, and moksa. This walk around is called pradakshina.

Large temples also have pillared halls called mandapa. One on the east side, serves as the waiting room for pilgrims and devotees. The mandapa may be a separate structure in older temples, but in newer temples this space is integrated into the temple superstructure. Mega temple sites have a main temple surrounded by smaller temples and shrines, but these are still arranged by principles of symmetry, grids and mathematical precision. An important principle found in the layout of Hindu temples is mirroring and repeating fractal-like design structure, each unique yet also repeating the central common principle, one which Susan Lewandowski refers to as “an organism of repeating cells”.

Exceptions to the square grid principle
Predominant number of Hindu temples exhibit the perfect square grid principle. However, there are some exceptions. For example, the Teli ka Mandir in Gwalior, built in the 8th century CE is not a square but is a rectangle consisting of stacked squares. Further, the temple explores a number of structures and shrines in 1:1, 1:2, 1:3, 2:5, 3:5 and 4:5 ratios. These ratios are exact, suggesting the architect intended to use these harmonic ratios, and the rectangle pattern was not a mistake, nor an arbitrary approximation. Other examples of non-square harmonic ratios are found at Naresar temple site of Madhya Pradesh and Nakti-Mata temple near Jaipur, Rajasthan. Michael Meister states that these exceptions mean the ancient Sanskrit manuals for temple building were guidelines, and Hinduism permitted its artisans flexibility in expression and aesthetic independence.

The Hindu text Sthapatya Veda describes many plans and styles of temples of which the following are found in other derivative literature: Chaturasra (square), Ashtasra (octagonal), Vritta (circular), Ayatasra (rectangular), Ayata Ashtasra (rectangular-octagonal fusion), Ayata Vritta (elliptical), Hasti Prishta (apsidal), Dwayasra Vrita (rectangular-circular fusion); in Tamil literature, the Prana Vikara (shaped like a Tamil Om sign) is also found. Methods of combining squares and circles to produce all of these plans are described in the Hindu texts.

The builders
The temples were built by guilds of architects, artisans and workmen. Their knowledge and craft traditions, states Michell, were originally preserved by the oral tradition, later with palm-leaf manuscripts. The building tradition was typically transmitted within families from one generation to the next, and this knowledge was jealously guarded. The guilds were like a corporate body that set rules of work and standard wages. These guilds over time became wealthy, and themselves made charitable donations as evidenced by inscriptions. The guilds covered almost every aspect of life in the camps around the site where the workmen lived during the period of construction, which in the case of large projects might be several years.

The work was led by a chief architect (sutradhara). The construction superintendent was equal in his authority. Other important members were stonemason chief and the chief image-maker who collaborated to complete a temple. The sculptors were called shilpins. Women participated in temple building, but in lighter work such as polishing stones and clearing. Hindu texts are inconsistent about which caste did the construction work, with some texts accepting all castes to work as a shilpin. The Brahmins were the experts in art theory and guided the workmen when needed. They also performed consecration rituals of the superstructure and in the sanctum.

In the earliest periods of Hindu art, from about the 4th century to about the 10th century, the artists had considerable freedom and this is evidenced in the considerable variations and innovations in images crafted and temple designs. Later, much of this freedom was lost as iconography became more standardized and the demand for iconometry consistency increased. This "presumably reflected the influence of brahman theologians" states Michell, and the "increasing dependence of the artist upon the brahmins" on suitable forms of sacred images. The "individual pursuit of self-expression" in a temple project was not allowed and instead, the artist expressed the sacred values in the visual form through a temple, for the most part anonymously.

The sponsors used contracts for the building tasks. Though great masters probably had assistants to help complete principal images in a temple, the reliefs panels in a Hindu temple were "almost certainly the inspiration of a single artist".

Schools of temple building tradition
Along with guilds, surviving texts suggest that several schools of Hindu temple architecture had developed in ancient India. Each school developed its own gurukuls (study centres) and texts. Of these, state Bharne and Krusche, two became most prominent: the Vishwakarma school and the Maya (Devanagari: मय not to be pronounced as Maayaa) school. The Vishwakarma school is credited with treatises, terminology and innovations related to the Nagara style of architecture, while the Maya school with those related to the Dravida style. The style now called Vesara bridges and combines elements of the Nagara and the Dravida styles, it probably reflects one of the other extinct schools.

Some scholars have questioned the relevance of these texts, whether the artists relied on silpa sastras theory and Sanskrit construction manuals probably written by Brahmins, and did these treatises precede or follow the big temples and ancient sculptures therein. Other scholars question whether big temples and complex symmetric architecture or sculpture with consistent themes and common iconography across distant sites, over many centuries, could have been built by artists and architects without adequate theory, shared terminology and tools, and if so how. According to Adam Hardy – an architecture historian and professor of Asian Architecture, the truth "must lie somewhere in between". According to George Michell – an art historian and professor specializing in Hindu Architecture, the theory and the creative field practice likely co-evolved, and the construction workers and artists building complex temples likely consulted the theoreticians when they needed to.

Various styles of architecture
The ancient Hindu texts on architecture such as Brihatsamhita and others, states Michell, classify temples into five orders based on their typological features: Nagara, Dravida, Vesara, ellipse and rectangle. The plan described for each include square, octagonal and apsidal. Their horizontal plan regulates the vertical form. Each temple architecture in turn has developed its own vocabulary, with terms that overlap but do not necessarily mean exactly the same thing in another style and may apply to a different part of the temple. Following a general historical division, the early Hindu temples, up to the 7th or 8th century, are often called classical or ancient temples, while those after the classical period to the 12th or 13th century are sometimes referred to as medieval. However, this division does not reflect a major break in Hindu architecture, which continued to evolve gradually across these periods.

The style of Hindu temple architecture is not only the result of the theology, spiritual ideas, and the early Hindu texts but also a result of innovation driven by regional availability of raw materials and the local climate. Some materials of construction were imported from distant regions, but much of the temples were built from readily available materials. In some regions, such as in South Karnataka, the local availability of soft stone led to Hoysala architects to innovate architectural styles that are difficult with hard crystalline rocks. In other places, artists used to cut granite or other stones to build temples and create sculptures. Rock faces allowed artists to carve cave temples or a region's rocky terrain encouraged monolithic rock-cut temple architecture. In regions where stones were unavailable, brick temples flourished. Hindu temple architecture has historically been affected by the building material available in each region, its "tonal value, texture and structural possibilities" states Michell.

India

Dravida and Nagara architecture 
Of the different styles of temple architecture in India, the Nagara architecture of northern India and the Dravidian architecture of southern India are most common. Other styles are also found. For example, the rainy climate and the materials of construction available in Bengal, Kerala, Java and Bali Indonesia have influenced the evolutions of styles and structures in these regions. At other sites such as Ellora and Pattadakal, adjacent temples may have features drawing from different traditions, as well as features in a common style local to that region and period. In modern era literature, many styles have been named after the royal dynasties in whose territories they were built.

Regional styles
The architecture of the rock-cut temples, particularly the rathas, became a model for south Indian temples. Architectural features, particularly the sculptures, were widely adopted in South Indian, Cambodian, Annamese and Javanese temples. Descendants of the sculptors of the shrines are artisans in contemporary Mahabalipuram.

Badami Chalukya architecture
The Badami Chalukya Architecture style originated by 5th century in Aihole and was perfected in Pattadakal and Badami.

Between 500 and 757 CE, Badami Chalukyas built Hindu temples out of sandstone cut into enormous blocks from the outcrops in the chains of the Kaladgi hills.

In Aihole, known as the "Cradle of Indian architecture," there are over 150 temples scattered around the village. The Lad Khan Temple is the oldest. The Durga Temple is notable for its semi-circular apse, elevated plinth and the gallery that encircles the sanctum sanctorum. A sculpture of Vishnu sitting atop a large cobra is at Hutchimali Temple. The Ravalphadi cave temple celebrates the many forms of Shiva. Other temples include the Konthi temple complex and the Meguti Jain temple.

Pattadakal is a World Heritage Site, where one finds the Virupaksha temple; it is the biggest temple, having carved scenes from the great epics of the Ramayana and the Mahabharata. Other temples at Pattadakal are Mallikarjuna, Kashivishwanatha, Galaganatha and Papanath.

Gadag architecture

The Gadag style of architecture is also called Western Chalukya architecture. The style flourished for 150 years (1050 to 1200 CE); in this period, about 50 temples were built. Some examples are the Saraswati temple in the Trikuteshwara temple complex at Gadag, the Doddabasappa Temple at Dambal, the Kasivisvesvara Temple at Lakkundi, and the Amriteshwara temple at Annigeri. which is marked by ornate pillars with intricate sculpture. This style originated during the period of the Kalyani Chalukyas (also known as Western Chalukya) Someswara I.

Kalinga architecture

The design which flourished in eastern Indian state of Odisha and Northern Andhra Pradesh are called Kalinga style of architecture. The style consists of three distinct type of temples namely Rekha Deula, Pidha Deula and Khakhara Deula. Deula means "temple" in the local language. The former two are associated with Vishnu, Surya and Shiva temple while the third is mainly with Chamunda and Durga temples. The Rekha deula and Khakhara deula houses the sanctum sanctorum while the Pidha Deula constitutes outer dancing and offering halls.

The prominent examples of Rekha Deula are Lingaraja Temple of Bhubaneswar and Jagannath Temple of Puri. One of the prominent example of Khakhara Deula is Vaital Deula. The Konark Sun Temple is a living example of Pidha Deula.

Māru-Gurjara architecture
Māru-Gurjara architecture, or Solaṅkī style, is a style of north Indian temple architecture that originated in Gujarat and Rajasthan from the 11th to 13th centuries, under the Chaulukya dynasty (or Solaṅkī dynasty). Although originating as a regional style in Hindu temple architecture, it became especially popular in Jain temples and, mainly under Jain patronage, later spread across India and to diaspora communities around the world.

On the exteriors, the style is distinguished from other north Indian temple styles of the period in "that the external walls of the temples have been structured by increasing numbers of projections and recesses, accommodating sharply carved statues in niches. These are normally positioned in superimposed registers, above the lower bands of moldings. The latter display continuous lines of horse riders, elephants, and kīrttimukhas. Hardly any segment of the surface is left unadorned."   The main shikhara tower usually has many urushringa subsidiary spirelets on it, and two smaller side-entrances with porches are common in larger temples.  

Interiors are if anything even more lavishly decorated, with elaborate carving on most surfaces. In particular, Jain temples often have small low domes carved on the inside with a highly intricate rosette design.  Another distinctive feature is "flying" arch-like elements between pillars, touching the horizontal beam above in the centre, and elaborately carved.  These have no structural function, and are purely decorative.  The style developed large pillared halls, many open at the sides, with Jain temples often having one closed and two pillared halls in sequence on the main axis leading to the shrine. 
  
The style mostly fell from use in Hindu temples in its original regions by the 13th century, especially as the area had fallen to the Muslim Delhi Sultanate by 1298.  But, unusually for an Indian temple style, it continued to be used by Jains there and elsewhere, with a notable "revival" in the 15th century.  Since then it has continued in use in Jain and some Hindu temples, and from the late 20th century has spread to temples built outside India by both the Jain diaspora and Hindus.  Some buildings mix Māru-Gurjara elements with those of local temple styles and modern international ones.  Generally, where there is elaborate carving, often still done by craftsmen from Gujarat or Rajasthan, this has more ornamental and decorative work than small figures.  In particular the style is used in India and abroad by the Swaminarayan sect.  Sometimes the Māru-Gurjara influence is limited to the "flying arches" and mandapa ceiling rosettes, and a preference for white marble.

Southeast Asia as part of Greater India

Architecture of the southeast nations was inspired by the Indian temple architecture, as those were Indianised as part of the Greater India.

Champa architecture

Between the 6th and the 16th century, the Kingdom of Champa flourished in present-day central and southern Vietnam. Unlike the Javanese that mostly used volcanic andesite stone for their temples, and Khmer of Angkor which mostly employed grey sandstones to construct their religious buildings, the Cham built their temples from reddish bricks.  The most important remaining sites of Cham bricks temple architecture include Mỹ Sơn near Da Nang, Po Nagar near Nha Trang, and Po Klong Garai near Phan Rang.

Typically, a Cham temple complex consisted of several different kinds of buildings. They are kalan, a brick sanctuary, typically in the form of a tower with garbahgriha used to host the murti of deity. A mandapa is an entry hallway connected with a sanctuary. A kosagrha or "fire-house" is a temple construction typically with a saddle-shaped roof, used to house the valuables belonging to the deity or to cook for the deity. The gopura was a gate-tower leading into a walled temple complex. These building types are typical for Hindu temples in general; the classification is valid not only for the architecture of Champa, but also for other architectural traditions of Greater India.

Indonesian architecture

Temples are called candi in Indonesia, whether it is Buddhist or Hindu. A Candi refers to a structure based on the Indian type of single-celled shrine, with a pyramidal tower above it (Meru tower in Bali), and a portico for entrance, mostly built between the 7th to 15th centuries. In Hindu Balinese architecture, a candi shrine can be found within a pura compound. The best example of Indonesian Javanese Hindu temple architecture is the 9th century Prambanan (Shivagrha) temple compound, located in Central Java, near Yogyakarta. This largest Hindu temple in Indonesia has three main prasad towers, dedicated to Trimurti gods. Shiva temple, the largest main temple is towering to 47 metre-high (154 ft).

The term "candi" itself is believed was derived from Candika, one of the manifestations of the goddess Durga as the goddess of death.

The candi architecture follows the typical Hindu architecture traditions based on Vastu Shastra. The temple layout, especially in central Java period, incorporated mandala temple plan arrangements and also the typical high towering spires of Hindu temples. The candi was designed to mimic Meru, the holy mountain the abode of gods. The whole temple is a model of Hindu universe according to Hindu cosmology and the layers of Loka.

The candi structure and layout recognize the hierarchy of the zones, spanned from the less holy to the holiest realms. The Indic tradition of Hindu-Buddhist architecture recognize the concept of arranging elements in three parts or three elements. Subsequently, the design, plan and layout of the temple follows the rule of space allocation within three elements; commonly identified as foot (base), body (centre), and head (roof). They are Bhurloka represented by the outer courtyard and the foot (base) part of each temples, Bhuvarloka represented by the middle courtyard and the body of each temples, and Svarloka which symbolized by the roof of Hindu structure usually crowned with ratna (sanskrit: jewel) or vajra.

Khmer architecture

Before the 14th century, the Khmer Empire flourished in present-day Cambodia with its influence extended to most of mainland Southeast Asia. Its great capital, Angkor ("Capital City", derived from Sanskrit "nagara"), contains some of the most important and the most magnificent example of Khmer temple architecture. The classic style of Angkorian temple is demonstrated by the 12th century Angkor Wat. Angkorian builders mainly used sandstone and laterite as temple building materials.

The main superstructure of typical Khmer temple is a towering prasat called prang which houses the garbhagriha inner chamber, where the murti of Vishnu or Shiva, or a lingam resides. Khmer temples were typically enclosed by a concentric series of walls, with the central sanctuary in the middle; this arrangement represented the mountain ranges surrounding Mount Meru, the mythical home of the gods. Enclosures are the spaces between these walls, and between the innermost wall and the temple itself. The walls defining the enclosures of Khmer temples are frequently lined by galleries, while passage through the walls is by way of gopuras located at the cardinal points. The main entrance usually adorned with elevated causeway with cruciform terrace.

Glossary
The Hindu texts on temple architecture have an extensive terminology. Most terms have several different names in the various Indian languages used in different regions  of India, as well as the Sanscrit names used in ancient texts.  A few of the more common terms are tabulated below, mostly in their Sanscrit/Hindi forms:

Gallery

See also

 Temple tank
 Vedic altars
 Indonesian architecture, Candi of Indonesia
 Rock-cut architecture
 Indian rock-cut architecture
 Architecture of Angkor
 Hemadpanthi architecture Style
 Dwajasthambam (flagstaff)

Notes

References

Bibliography

Dehejia, V. (1997). Indian Art. Phaidon: London. .

 Hardy, Adam (2007). The Temple Architecture of India, Wiley: Chichester. 
 
Harle, J.C., The Art and Architecture of the Indian Subcontinent, 2nd edn. 1994, Yale University Press Pelican History of Art, 

Michell, George (1990), The Penguin Guide to the Monuments of India, Volume 1: Buddhist, Jain, Hindu, 1990, Penguin Books, 

Rajan, K.V. Soundara (1998). Rock-Cut Temple Styles. Somaiya Publications: Mumbai.

External links
 Sabha, Vedic altar, Indian temples and Buddhist Mandala: Drawings, Patrick George, University of Pennsylvania
 Space and Cosmology in the Hindu Temple
 Hindu Javanese Temples

 
Sacral architecture